is a Japanese traditional confectionery made of azuki or other beans, covered with refined sugar after simmering with sugar syrup and drying.
It was developed by Hosoda Yasubei during the Bunkyū years (1861–1863) in the Edo period. He opened a wagashi store in Tokyo, which he named for his childhood name: Eitaro. This store continues to operate.

Amanattō was originally called ; the name was abbreviated to amanattō after World War II. The resemblance of the name to the fermented bean dish nattō is coincidental.

In Hokkaidō, amanattō is used in cooking sekihan. For this reason, unlike other areas in East Asia, the sekihan of Hokkaidō is a little sweet.

See also
 List of legume dishes

References

Wagashi
Legume dishes